North Laine is a shopping and residential district of Brighton, on the English south coast. Once a slum area, it is now seen as Brighton's bohemian and cultural quarter, with many pubs, cafés, theatres and museums.

History

"Laine" is a Sussex dialect term for an open tract of land at the base of the Downs, which itself is derived from an Anglo-Saxon legal term for a kind of land holding.

The space surrounding Brighton was once occupied by five of these "laines", open farming plots of a type that seem to have been generally unchanged in style since the Middle Ages, one of which was North Laine.  By the 19th century, the farming plots (which had been for centuries subdivided into hides and furlongs) were encircled by major municipal roads for Brighton.  With building developments across Brighton beginning to encroach upon the fields, the tracks that had divided the individual hide plots were normalized into streets, and the area was soon appropriated as a new settlement and market area.  John Furner planted a market garden in the plots, and by 1840 a rail hub had been set up on the northern border of North Laine, Brighton railway station.

During the reigns of George IV and William IV and through the first quarter of the reign of Queen Victoria, despite the grandeur of their Royal Pavilion, the North Laine section was known mostly for its squalor, abysmal living conditions and high concentration of slaughterhouses. One resident of note was George Herbert Volk, second son of railway engineer Magnus Volk, who worked in a small workshop at 86 Gloucester Road in the years 1910-1912. This building is now home to Silicon Beach Training. By the 1860s, the city began to clean up the area, knocking down old tenement houses (population density in one slum neighbourhood, Orange Row in the Pimlico slum district, was approximately 130 people to 17 houses) to replace them with more modern streets.  A famous resident at this time was Tom Sayers, a popular British heavyweight boxing champion of the middle Victorian era.  He was born in the Pimlico slum area and trained in North Laine.  At his death in 1865, 10,000 people attended his funeral at Highgate, London.

1970s: Saved from demolition
Ken Fines (1923–2008) was Borough Planning Officer for Brighton from 1974 to 1983. He is credited with having saved the North Laine area from extensive redevelopment that could have seen existing buildings being replaced by new high-rise buildings, a flyover and a large car park. Fines felt the area had charm, and pressured the local council to retain it. After considerable opposition by council members and businesses, the council eventually came round to his view, and the North Laine Conservation Area was designated in 1977, named after his observation of the historic name.  In North Road, in the centre of the North Laine area, is a plaque commemorating Fines.

Today

Today North Laine is a bohemian shopping area stretching from Trafalgar Street, Kensington Gardens, Sydney Street, Gardner Street and Bond Street - mostly pedestrianised - popular both with locals and tourists, well served with cafés, bars and entertainment venues including theatres such as Komedia, which is in a former Tesco supermarket. The latter had been closed for some years in anticipation of major redevelopment of the area which failed to materialise; in the building was for some time a covered market with a number of small stallholders, until Komedia moved in from their previous home in Kemptown.  The first branch of Anita Roddick's Body Shop, later to become a multinational business, was opened at 22 Kensington Gardens. Typical retailers include art, antiques, architectural salvage, second-hand books, fine wines and spirits, music, "retro" clothing, graphic novels, musical instruments and new age paraphernalia. There is a high turnover of boutique-style shops in North Laine in general.

One of the less shopping-oriented streets, Upper Gardner Street, is closed to traffic every Saturday for an on-street market. Amongst the houses of this street are several antiques dealers.

The City Council redeveloped a gap site, constructing a new library and public square, Jubilee Square, which became available to the public in 2005. This significantly changed the flow of pedestrians, which prior to this had been predominantly straight through North Laine on the main shopping streets, and is now more two-dimensional.

References

Bibliography

External links
 Historical background from the Community Association

Areas of Brighton and Hove
Conservation areas in England